Saint Catherine South Eastern is a parliamentary constituency represented in the Parliament of Jamaica. It elects one Member of Parliament by the first past the post system of election. The constituency covers the south eastern part of Saint Catherine Parish. It has been represented by Robert Miller from the Jamaica Labour Party since the 2020 general election

Members of Parliament 

 Colin Fagan of the PNP (2007 to 2020)

References 

Parliamentary constituencies of Jamaica